Bukar or Bukar Kura bin Umar al-Kanemi (c. 1830-c. 1884 or 1885) was Shehu of Borno from 1881 to c. 1884.

Reign of Bukar
Bukar became Shehu of Borno in 1881 at the death of his father Umar I ibn Muhammad al-Amin. His three-year reign was marked by a deep economic crisis which forced him to impose a tax on his subjects. In Kanuri language, this tax was called kumoreji (splitting a calabash in half) which meant that Bukar appropriated half the wealth of his subjects.

Bukar as seen by Heinrich Barth
In 1851, a British expedition led by Heinrich Barth arrived in Borno. Barth met Bukar when he was around twelve and according to him he was:

Dynasty

Footnotes

Bibliography
 Barth, Heinrich, Travels and Discoveries in North and Central Africa (London: Longman, 1857).
 Brenner, Louis, The Shehus of Kukawa: A History of the Al-Kanemi Dynasty of Bornu, Oxford Studies in African Affairs (Oxford, Clarendon Press, 1973).
 Cohen, Ronald, The Kanuri of Bornu, Case Studies in Cultural Anthropology (New York: Holt, 1967).
 Isichei, Elizabeth, A History of African Societies to 1870 (Cambridge: Cambridge University Press, 1997), pp. 318–320, .
 Lange, Dierk, 'The kingdoms and peoples of Chad', in General history of Africa, ed. by Djibril Tamsir Niane, IV (London: Unesco, Heinemann, 1984), pp. 238–265.
 Last, Murray, ‘Le Califat De Sokoto Et Borno’, in Histoire Generale De l'Afrique, Rev. ed. (Paris: Presence Africaine, 1986), pp. 599–646.
 Lavers, John, "The Al- Kanimiyyin Shehus: a Working Chronology" in Berichte des Sonderforschungsbereichs, 268, Bd. 2, Frankfurt a. M. 1993: 179-186.
 Nachtigal, Gustav, Sahara und Sudan : Ergebnisse Sechsjähriger Reisen in Afrika (Berlin: Weidmann, 1879).
 
 Palmer, Herbert Richmond, The Bornu Sahara and Sudan (London: John Murray, 1936).

External links
 Kanuri Studies Association

Royalty of Borno
1830s births
1880s deaths
19th-century rulers in Africa
19th-century Nigerian people